Ralf Wolter (26 November 1926 – 14 October 2022) was a German stage and screen actor. Wolter appeared in nearly 220 films and television series in his over 60 years as a character actor.

Life and career 
Wolter began his long career on the Berlin stage and in cabaret during the late 1940s. He made his first film appearance in Die Frauen des Herrn S. and quickly achieved prominence as an actor for comedic supporting roles. In 1961, he appeared as the baldheaded Soviet agent Borodenko in Billy Wilder's comedy One, Two, Three with James Cagney and Horst Buchholz. Another Hollywood film with Wolter in a supporting role was Cabaret (1972), where he played, alongside Liza Minnelli, the role of the neighbour Herr Ludwig, a publisher of pornographic books who later turns out to be a Nazi.

In Germany, Wolter achieved his greatest fame as the eccentric but friendly trapper Sam Hawkens and as Hadschi Halef Omar in a number of highly successful Karl May film adaptations during the 1960s. He reprised his role as Sam Hawkens in a television series from 1980. He also appeared with Heinz Erhardt in the 1970 comedy What Is the Matter with Willi? and in a few musical films with singing child star Heintje Simons. As his film roles got more obscure during his later years, he turned more and more towards television since the 1970s. He appeared in some of the most successful German television series.

In May 2002, he caused a motorway accident on the Bundesautobahn 24 with three deaths. He was sentenced to ten months on conditional discharge.

Wolter was married with his wife Edith from 1959 until his death, they had two children. He died on 14 October 2022, at the age of 95.

Selected filmography 

 Die Frauen des Herrn S. (1951) – Pachulles
 The Phantom of the Big Tent (1954) – Motta, Geschäftsführer
 The Captain and His Hero (1955) – Ängstlicher Rekrut
 Sergeant Borck (1955) – Zopfer
 Hotel Adlon (1955) – Mann vom Soldatencorps (uncredited)
 Vor Gott und den Menschen (1955)
 Your Life Guards (1955) – Bursche Jonny
 Urlaub auf Ehrenwort (1955) – Gefreiter Max Schmiedecke
 The Girl from Flanders (1956) – German Soldier
 A Thousand Melodies (1956) – Hugo Pähler
 Der Glockengießer von Tirol (1956) – Aufnahmeleiter Knopf
 My Father, the Actor (1956) – Lokal-Besucher
 The Model Husband (1956) – Trainer
 Like Once Lili Marleen (1956) – Deutscher Soldat
 The Old Forester House (1957) – Max
 Der Adler vom Velsatal (1957)
 Jede Nacht in einem anderen Bett (1957) – Portier
 Victor and Victoria (1957) – Friseur (uncredited)
 Confessions of Felix Krull (1957) – Gestellungspflichtiger
 Tired Theodore (1957) – Gerichtsvollzieher Storch
 Spring in Berlin (1957) – Erklärer im Rundfahrtbus
 The Legs of Dolores (1957) – Mecki Wenzel, ein Alles-Könner
 The Spessart Inn (1958) – Räuber (uncredited)
 A Time to Love and a Time to Die (1958) – Feldmann the Taylor (uncredited)
 Schmutziger Engel (1958) – Turnlehrer
 Grabenplatz 17 (1958) – Ringrichter
 The Muzzle (1958) – Thürnagel
 Wir Wunderkinder (1958) – Bathroom waiter (uncredited)
 Wenn die Conny mit dem Peter (1958) – Pedell Haberstock
 Schlag auf Schlag (1959) – Balduin Balg
 Freddy, the Guitar and the Sea (1959) – Fietje
 Bobby Dodd greift ein (1959)
 Every Day Isn't Sunday (1959) – Dienstmann Huber
 Of Course, the Motorists (1959) – Oberwachtmeister
 Roses for the Prosecutor (1959) – Hessel
 The Beautiful Adventure (1959) – Taschendieb
 Two Times Adam, One Time Eve (1959) – Paavo
 Peter Voss, Hero of the Day (1959) – Charley, der Jockey
 Triplets on Board (1959) – Friseur
 The Goose of Sedan (1959) – Uhlan Lehmann
 The High Life (1960) – Schlotter
 We Cellar Children (1960) – Kameramann Keschke der 'Neuen Deutschen Schau'
 Conny and Peter Make Music (1960) – Lehmann, Sulzbachs Assistant
 Grounds for Divorce (1960) – Dr. Waldgeist
 Mal drunter - mal drüber (1960) – Buschbeck
 Kauf dir einen bunten Luftballon (1961) – Luggi
 Eine hübscher als die andere (1961) – Straßenkehrer
 Immer Ärger mit dem Bett (1961) – Meister
 Adieu, Lebewohl, Goodbye (1961)
 Robert and Bertram (1961) – Toni Knauer
 Blind Justice (1961) – Fotograf
 One, Two, Three (1961) – Borodenko
 The Liar (1961) – (uncredited)
 Ramona (1961) – Delon
 Freddy und das Lied der Südsee (1962) – Hannes
 The Post Has Gone (1962) – Herr Ratsam
 Treasure of the Silver Lake (1962) – Sam Hawkens
 Love Has to Be Learned (1963) – Müller
 Ferien wie noch nie (1963)
  (1963, TV Movie) – Juror 6 
 Apache Gold (1963) – Sam Hawkens
 Das Wirtshaus von Dartmoor (1964) – O'Hara
 Old Shatterhand (1964) – Sam Hawkens
 The Shoot (1964) – Hadschi Halef Omar
 Coffin from Hong Kong (1964) – Bob Tooly
 Massacre at Marble City (1964) – Tim Fletcher
 The Treasure of the Aztecs (1965) – Andreas Hasenpfeffer
 The Pyramid of the Sun God (1965) – Andreas Hasenpfeffer
 Wild Kurdistan (1965) – Hadschi Halef Omar
 The Desperado Trail (1965) – Sam Hawkens
 Kingdom of the Silver Lion (1965) – Hadschi Halef Omar
 Who Killed Johnny R.? (1966) – Billy Monroe
 Winnetou and the Crossbreed (1966) – Sam Hawkens
 Treasure of San Gennaro (1966) – Frank
  (1967, TV Series) – Titus Bunge
 Murderers Club of Brooklyn (1967) – Photographer (voice, uncredited)
 Spy Today, Die Tomorrow (1967) – Spiegel
 Mittsommernacht (1967) – Iskey
 The Heathens of Kummerow (1967) – Krischan
 Heubodengeflüster (1967) – Dr. Leo Dorn
 Paradies der flotten Sünder (1968) – Butler Percy
 Otto ist auf Frauen scharf (1968) – Dr. Kobalt
 Sexy Susan Sins Again (1968) – Bookdealer
 The Valley of Death (1968) – Sam Hawkens
  (1968, TV Movie) – Dr. Knopf
 Hannibal Brooks (1969) – Dr. Mendel
 House of Pleasure (1969) – Watchmaker Bobinet
  (1969) – Toni
 Charley's Uncle (1969) – Polizist
 The Young Tigers of Hong Kong (1969) – Bob
 Heintje: A Heart Goes on a Journey (1969) – Harry
 Helgalein (1969)
  (1969) – Philippe
  (1969) – Cajetan Fingerlos
 Heintje - Einmal wird die Sonne wieder scheinen (1970) – Jahrmarktsbude
 Hilfe, mich liebt eine Jungfrau (1970)
 What Is the Matter with Willi? (1970) – Felix Klein
 Heintje - Mein bester Freund (1970) – Max
 Love, Vampire Style (1970) – Christian Wagner
 Das Glöcklein unterm Himmelbett (1970) – Emil Giesecke
 Zwanzig Mädchen und die Pauker – Heute steht die Penne kopf (1971)
 Das haut den stärksten Zwilling um (1971) – Richard Strauss
 Aunt Trude from Buxtehude (1971) – Der Hausverwalter
 Wir hau'n den Hauswirt in die Pfanne (1971) – Amadeus Kleinschmidt
 Morgen fällt die Schule aus (1971) – Dr. Geis
 Einer spinnt immer (1971) – Notar
 Holiday Report (1971) – Horst-Dieter Mitterer
 Außer Rand und Band am Wolfgangsee (1972) – Notar
 Cabaret (1972) – Herr Ludwig
 Kinderarzt Dr. Fröhlich (1972) – Notar Fritz Pfeiffer
My Daughter, Your Daughter (1972) – Bibo
 Lilli - die Braut der Kompanie (1972) – Stabsarzt
 The Heath Is Green (1972) – Herr Hoegen
 The 500 Pound Jerk (1973, TV Movie) – Glabov
 Old Barge, Young Love (1973) – Erwin
 Unsere Tante ist das Letzte (1973) – Luigi
 Schwarzwaldfahrt aus Liebeskummer (1974) – Evas Vater
 Waldrausch (1977) – Rixner
 The Serpent's Egg (1977) – Partner of the Master of Ceremonies
 Graf Dracula beißt jetzt in Oberbayern (1979) – Boris
 Mein Freund Winnetou (1980, TV Series) – Sam Hawkens
  (1982) – Rundfunkintendant
 A Love in Germany (1983) – Schulze
 Lass das - ich hass das (1983) – Richter
  (1985) – Kaminski
 Der Schatz im Niemandsland (1987, TV Series) – Kriminalbeamter
 High Score (1990)
 Ein Schloß am Wörthersee (1990, TV Series) – Schultz
 Otto - Der Liebesfilm (1992) – Intendant Gotthilf Gutmann
 Mit Leib und Seele (1990–1993, TV Series) – Horst Metzger
 Asterix Conquers America (1994) – Miraculix (German version, voice)
 Vendetta (1995) – Don Giovanni
 Killer Condom (1996) – Prof. Smirnoff
 The Children of Captain Grant (1996) – Monk
  (2009) – Peter
  (2012) – Willy Stronz

References

External links
 

1926 births
2022 deaths
20th-century German male actors
21st-century German male actors
German male film actors
German male television actors
German people convicted of manslaughter
Male actors from Berlin